Emirhisar can refer to:

 Emirhisar, Çivril
 Emirhisar, Sandıklı